Novlyanka is a rural locality (a settlement) in Novlyanskoye Rural Settlement, Selivanovsky District, Vladimir Oblast, Russia. The population was 915 as of 2010. There are 10 streets.

Geography 
Novlyanka is located on the left bank of the Ushna River, 7 km south of Krasnaya Gorbatka (the district's administrative centre) by road. Novlyanka (village) is the nearest rural locality.

References 

Rural localities in Selivanovsky District